Water of Life may refer to:
The Fountain of Youth
 The Water of Life (Christianity), referred to in the Book of Revelation 22:1.
The Water of Life (German fairy tale), a German fairy tale collected by the Brothers Grimm (1823)
The Water of Life (Catalan fairy tale), a Spanish fairy tale collected by D. Francisco de S. Maspous y Labros, in Cuentos Populars Catalans (1885)
Water of Life (Dune), a fictional drug in Frank Herbert's Dune novels
The Bold Knight, the Apples of Youth, and the Water of Life, Russian fairy tale (1862)

Alcoholic spirits
Aqua vitae, Latin for "water of life", meaning a concentrated solution of ethanol 
Uisce beatha, an early Irish whiskey, the root of the word "whiskey"
Akvavit, a Scandinavian distilled drink
Eau de vie, a French distilled drink